Shishir Sharma (born 10 January 1955) is an Indian film and television actor. He appeared in Zee TV's Ghar Ki Lakshmi Betiyann, and is known for playing the role of Jagmohan Prasad in Yahaaan Main Ghar Ghar Kheli. Currently, he can be seen in second season of the web-show Permanent Roommates on TVFPlay. Sharma has acted in more than 40 films and TV serials including Story of a Lonely Goldfish, Swabhimaan, Bombay Boys, Sarkar Raj and The Second Best Exotic Marigold Hotel.

Television

Filmography

Web series

References

External links
 
 
 Shishir Sharma on Radio Masti 24x7 Singapore founder Renuka Arora Bhagat

Living people
Indian male film actors
Indian male television actors
Indian male soap opera actors
1955 births